The California red-sided garter snake (Thamnophis sirtalis infernalis) is a subspecies of the common garter snake. This slender subspecies of natricine snake is indigenous to North America and is one of three recognized subspecies of Thamnophis sirtalis found in California. While commonly confused with the subspecies T. s. concinnus, it is biologically part of the population of the subspecies T. s. tetrataenia, as pointed out by Boundy and Rossman (1995), but was preserved as T. s. infernalis as a neotype under ICZN code Article 75 in a 2000 decision by the International Commission on Zoological Nomenclature (ICZN) in 2000 in order to preserve the existing subspecies taxonomy. 

Most California red-sided garter snakes have a pattern of blue stripes on a black and red background. Their average total length is about 55 cm (22 in), with a maximum total length of about 100 cm (39 in).

Description 
Thamnophis sirtalis infernalis features a basic pattern of three stripes including yellow or blue stripes over a primarily red body, with a row of black spots or blotches appearing in a stripe like pattern. The red can be more or less prominent depending on the specimen but appears in blotches and spots across the body and over the head. In some cases, the red may be less prominent, and the snake appears to be black with red markings. However, T. s. infernalis can be easily distinguished from the San Francisco garter snake (Thamnophis sirtalis tetrataenia), which has similar coloring, as it features red blotching and spots, rather than a single strip of red along the dorsal stripe.

The subspecies features an orange or red head, and can vary significantly in appearance based on the geographical location of the snake.

The California red-sided garter snake is a slender snake that is smaller and lighter than the San Francisco garter snake. Females typically reach 90–100 cm (35-39 inches) while males typically reach 65-75 centimeters (25-29.5), and are markedly thinner than females. While the recorded maximum size for T. sirtalis as a species is 137 cm (53.9 inches), it is uncommon to find a female T. s. infernalis over 100 cm (39.5 inches).

Taxonomy 
There is some confusion regarding the subspecific name of T. s. infernalis. Boundy and Rossman (1995) pointed out some nomenclature problems with the Pacific Coast populations of Thamnophis sirtalis subspecies. However, the suggestions that the subspecies T. s. tetrataenia be referred to as T. s. infernalis and that the current subspecies T. s. infernalis be included with the subspecies T. s. concinnus were denied by the International Commission on Zoological Nomenclature (ICZN) in 2000, and a neotype for T. s. infernalis was designated to conserve the traditional subspecies taxonomy.

Reproduction 
Thamnophis sirtalis infernalis is a viviparous snake, and they mate in the late winter to early spring. Live young are born in the mid-summer to early fall and are typically 12-20 centimeters (5-8 inches) in length. Clutch sizes vary, but typically vary from 8 to 20 young.

Like the red-spotted garter snake (T. s. concinnus), juvenile T. s. infernalis are born with faint colors, which grow increasingly brighter as the snake matures and sheds. Most juveniles are born yellow and become successively more blue as the snake matures and sheds.

Distribution 

Thamnophis sirtalis infernalis occurs throughout California and is found primarily in coastal dunes and marshes. The distribution is disjunct, as it is found ranging from coastal Humboldt County to coastal Monterey County, and is found in conjunction with some San Francisco garter snakes. However, T. s. infernalis was primarily replaced by another subspecies of the common garter snake, the valley garter snake (T. s. fitchi), in southern Monterey, meaning that they are absent from Monterey to Santa Barbara, but present from Santa Barbara to San Diego County. The subspecies was listed as endangered in the U.S. Endangered Species Act (USESA) of 1967, and listed as declining by the United States Fish and Wildlife Services in 1990.

Habitat 
Thamnophis sirtalis infernalis is typically associated with permanent or near-permanent bodies of water such as marshland, shallow water, and dunes. The sag ponds in the San Andreas Fault rift zone and freshwater coastal marshes are their primary habitat. T. s. infernalis also temporarily occurs in grassland and some woodland.

References 

Snakes of North America
Reptiles of the United States
Thamnophis